Samuel Oppong (born 12 May 1998) is a footballer who plays as a forward for FCM Traiskirchen. Born in Ghana, he has represented Austria internationally at youth levels U16 through U18.

Club career
Oppong made his Austrian Football First League debut for FC Blau-Weiß Linz on 11 August 2017 in a game against SV Ried.

In the summer 2020, Oppong moved to Austrian Regionalliga club FC Marchfeld Donauauen.

References

External links
 

Living people
1998 births
Austrian people of Ghanaian descent
Austrian footballers
Association football forwards
Austria youth international footballers
2. Liga (Austria) players
Austrian Regionalliga players
SK Rapid Wien players
FC Admira Wacker Mödling players
Olympiakos Nicosia players
FC Blau-Weiß Linz players
Kapfenberger SV players
Austrian expatriate footballers
Austrian expatriate sportspeople in Cyprus
Expatriate footballers in Cyprus